Butterfield Park is an unincorporated community and census-designated place (CDP) in Doña Ana County, New Mexico, United States. It was first listed as a CDP prior to the 2020 census.

The community is in eastern Doña Ana County, on the south side of U.S. Route 70, which leads southwest  to Las Cruces and northeast  to Alamogordo.

It is located in Las Cruces Public Schools.

Demographics

References 

Census-designated places in Doña Ana County, New Mexico
Census-designated places in New Mexico